Cocksure is the fourth album by Laura Stevenson. The album was released by Don Giovanni Records on October 30, 2015. A music video for her song "Jellyfish" was premiered on The A.V. Club website on the album's day of release.

Track listing

References

Laura Stevenson albums
2015 albums
Don Giovanni Records albums